The Line 4 of Wuhan Metro is the third line in Wuhan Metro system, and it will be the second metro line crossing the Yangtze river in Wuhan. It is colored grass-green, which is the identifying color of this line, which would appear on its trains, station signs, and the official subway map.

The whole construction was divided into two parts, being phase 1 and 2, which opened in 2013 and 2014, respectively. Phase 1, opened on December 28, 2013, runs through Wuchang in a northeast-southwest direction, connecting ,  and major commercial districts. Phase 2 will run in an east-west direction, linking Hanyang and Wuchang, tunneling through the Yangtze river in the proximity of the first Yangtze river bridge and connecting with phase 1 at Wuchang railway station.

The opening of phase 1 of Line 4 will form the skeleton of Wuhan's metro system. Right after its opening, the system (including Line 1, 2, and 4) will be able to accommodate millions of passengers a day, where a large proportion of them will be the cross-Yangtze passengers. But all stations on line 4 have been designed only to accommodate a six-car train (type B) in length and have no possibility to extend for future upgrading.

Overview

History
Phase 1 opened on December 28, 2013.
Phase 2 opened on December 28, 2014.
Caidian line (Western extension) opened on 25 September 2019.

Stations

Rolling stock 

The collection shoe is on the lower part of the vehicle. The third rail is a mix of steel and aluminum. A full train provides 176 seats, and can carry 1276 passengers by Chinese regulation of 9 people per square meter.

See also 

Wuhan Metro
Wuhan

References

 
Railway lines opened in 2013